Honghu Park is a public, urban park in Luohu District, Shenzhen, Guangdong, China. Located in Luohu District, Honghu Park is bordered by Sungang Bridge on the South, Honghu West Road on the West, Nigang Bridge on the North, and Honghu East Road and Wenjin North Road on the East. It is a comprehensive park of the theme of lotus, with water activities as feature entertainment activities. Honghu Park was officially opened to the public in 1984. Established in September 1984, Honghu Park is a multifunctional botanical garden and scenic spot integrating scientific research, lotus species collection and display as well as tourism.

Features

Bridges
 Duyi Bridge 
 Furong Bridge 
 Liuxi Bridge 
 Nongyue Bridge 
 Ouduan Bridge 
 Qinglian Bridge 
 Yinfeng Bridge

Ponds
 Yingri Pond

Islands
 Dongling Island 
 Hexian Island 
 Xixiu Island

Pavilions
 Chenxi Pavilion 
 Furong Pavilion 
 Hehan Pavilion 
 Liangyi Pavilion 
 Liuxia Pavilion

Others
 Pinhe Garden 
 Jushui Terrace 
 Lotus Exhibition Hall 
 Stele Gallery of Lotus 
 Playground 
 Barbecue site
 Swimming Pool

Transportation
 Take subway Line 7 to get off at Honghu Station. Getting out from Exit D and walk  to the Park.
 Take bus No. 23, 27, 213, 206, 300, 303, 312, 315 or 357 to Honghu Park Bus Stop.

Environmental concerns 
In November 2016, a sewage treatment plant began to build within the park, the environmentalists were concerned that plant will affect the water quality and ecological environment.

See also
 List of parks in Shenzhen

References

Botanical gardens in Guangdong
Parks in Shenzhen
1984 establishments in China
Luohu District